Serb People's Party (better known as Serb People's Party in/on Primorje,  / Srpska narodna stranka u/na Primorju, "Serb People's Party in/on the Littoral") was political party in the Kingdom of Dalmatia during  the time of Austria-Hungary.

Following the 1876 Dalmatian parliamentary election, the People's Party was in power. In 1878, led by Sava Bjelanović, the Serb members of the party left and founded the Serb Party.  The Serb Party retained the leading position in the provinces of upper Dalmatia (Dalmatian hinterland): Kninska Krajina, Bukovica, Ravni Kotari, as well as the Bay of Kotor (which is today in Montenegro).

A significant member of the Serb Party was Stjepan Mitrov Ljubiša. In his political efforts, he fought against the ethnic Italian domination in Dalmatian politics and culture, for the equality of religions and languages, for the emancipation of Serb populace in Dalmatia, the economic benefit of the province but also for the autonomy of Dalmatia and against the unification with Croatia-Slavonia. Stjepan Mitrov Ljubiša had been the President of the Dalmatian parliament between 1870 and 1878 when he was overthrown by the clerical Croat fraction in the People's Party led by Mihovil Pavlinović.

Diet of Dalmatia elections
1883: 8/41
1889: 9/41
1895: 9/41
1901: 6/41
1908: 7/41

See also
Serb People's Independent Party, in Croatia-Slavonia (1881-1918)
.Croat-Serb Coalition, alliance in Austro-Hungary (1905-1918)
Serb People's Radical Party, in Croatia-Slavonia (until 1905)

References

Political parties established in 1861
Political parties disestablished in 1905
Political parties in Austria-Hungary
Defunct political parties in Croatia
Kingdom of Dalmatia
History of the Serbs of Croatia
1861 establishments in the Austrian Empire
Ethnic organizations based in Austria-Hungary